K. J. Dillon (born May 11, 1993) is an American football safety who is a free agent. He played college football at West Virginia.

Professional career

Houston Texans
Dillon was drafted by the Houston Texans in the fifth round (159th overall) of the 2016 NFL Draft. He was placed on injured reserve on October 19, 2016.

On September 2, 2017, Dillon was waived by the Texans.

Arizona Cardinals
On December 7, 2017, Dillon was signed to the Arizona Cardinals' practice squad.

Arizona Hotshots
In 2018, Dillon signed with the Arizona Hotshots of the Alliance of American Football for the 2019 season, but was waived on January 10, 2019, before the start of the regular season.

In October 2019, the Houston Roughnecks drafted Dillon during the open phase of the 2020 XFL Draft.

References

External links 
 West Virginia Mountaineers bio

1993 births
Living people
People from Apopka, Florida
Players of American football from Florida
Sportspeople from Orange County, Florida
American football safeties
West Virginia Mountaineers football players
Houston Texans players
Arizona Cardinals players
Arizona Hotshots players